Yoshino Nishide (born 12 July 1955) is a Japanese diver. He competed in the men's 10 metre platform event at the 1976 Summer Olympics.

References

1955 births
Living people
Japanese male divers
Olympic divers of Japan
Divers at the 1976 Summer Olympics
Place of birth missing (living people)
20th-century Japanese people